Myathropa florea is a very common European and North African species of hoverfly. Adults may be seen on flowers from May to September. It is of a similar size to the common drone fly (Eristalis tenax), but Myathropa are generally more yellow, with two light bands to the thorax, interrupted with a black central smudge. In museum specimens, any yellow colour soon fades to brown after death. Like most Eristalini, Myathropa are rather variable in size, shape and colour.

Description
For terms see Morphology of Diptera
Wing length 7–12 mm Thorax dorsum with a characteristic "skull" black pattern. Abdomen black with yellow patterning. Legs pale and black. Larva described and figured by Rotheray (1994). 
.See references for determination.

Distribution
Palearctic from Fennoscandia South to Iberia and the Mediterranean basin. From Ireland eastwards across Europe and Russia, adventive on the Pacific coast of North America since 2005.

Biology

They occur in deciduous forests, fen carr, farmland with trees, parks, and gardens.

They visit many different species of flowers, including umbellifers, Castanea, Convolvulus, Crataegus, Chaerophyllum, Euonymus, Filipendula, Hedera, Rhododendron, Rubus, Sambucus, Solidago, Sorbus, and Viburnum opulus.

The flight period is May to October. Larvae feed on bacteria in organic waterlogged detritus, often in the shallow rot holes of tree stumps.

References

Eristalinae
Diptera of Africa
Diptera of Asia
Diptera of Europe
Hoverflies of North America
Insects described in 1758
Articles containing video clips
Taxa named by Carl Linnaeus